Bitter Coffee ( Ghahve-ye Talkh) is a historical comedy series directed by Mehran Modiri and produced by the Aghagolian brothers. Three episodes are released at a time (roughly every week) on three VCD or one DVD, priced in Iran at 25000 rials (at that time approximately $2.50). The first set of episodes were released on 13 September 2010.

Background and controversy
Production of the series began in June 2009. Bitter Coffee was meant to be produced for television, to be broadcast by the IRIB, but due to various disagreements between IRIB and the series' producers, it didn't air. An alleged reason for disagreement between the producers and IRIB was that the producers required all of the advertisement for the series to be used as their payment, but IRIB refused to agree. Another rumoured reason was disagreement about the planned content of the series. IRIB officials eventually refused to show Bitter Coffee, and the series was eventually distributed in VCD format, at various outlets throughout Iran.

Cast

Storyline

The series begins with history teacher Nima Zande-Karimi (Siamak Ansari) realising that his extensive research on Persian and world history is of little use to financing his day-to-day life. He is about to leave Tehran for good to go back to his hometown by the name of Darab, when he comes across young university student Roya Atabaki (Sahar Jafari-Jozani) who is researching for her final year dissertation, which is regarding the period 1198–1203, that is said to be a period of turmoil for Iran's ruling elite. Such turmoil that, very few books are available on that period for Roya's research. It is then that Nima receives an anonymous telephone call, which leads him to Niavaran Palace (currently a museum), where he is told to have a coffee and wait. The coffee (which is bitter) is ready and he duly drinks it, his sight becomes hazy, and when he manages to refocus he is in the year 1201 (1822 AD), and the story develops therein.

Reception

This was a very much anticipated series, as are all of Mehran Modiri's works, partly because it had been 4 years since his last major series work Baghe Mozaffar, discounting the two short series he did for the new years 1387 and 88, and partly because it had been rumoured to be ready for release the previous winter, and then the new year period for 89, before eventually being released at the end of the summer of 1389, and not on television but as a DVD release. As a result, according to the series' website, half a million copies of the first installment were sold on the first day of release alone.
At first Ghahve-ye Talkh was planned to be a 90-episode comedy series. Story of Bitter Coffee, like recent Modiri works, is focused on critiquing aspects of Iranian social behaviour.

References

External links 
 
 Persianesque Magazine
 Facebook fan page

Iranian comedy television series
2000s Iranian television series
2009 Iranian television series debuts
2010s Iranian television series
Islamic Republic of Iran Broadcasting original programming
Persian-language television shows